Millhouse is a village in the parish of Kilfinan. Located on the B8000 inland from Kames in the east and Portavadie in the west, on the Cowal peninsula, Argyll and Bute, Scotland.

History

Millhouse was the location of a 19th-century Powdermill (1839 until 1921).  The gunpowder was taken to nearby Kames, where the powdermill owners built a pier/quay for the loading of boats and the onward transport of their product.

References

External links

 Wild about Argyll, MILLHOUSE & THE ARDLAMONT PENINSULA - website

Villages in Cowal